Avantgarde is an indie rock band based in Spain.  

Avantgarde is an Indie-Pop Spanish band from Madrid, They scored two albums and they were touring across Spain and Portugal with the in Deluxe.

Discography

Albums
Super L (April 2004)
Read Between the Lines (April 2005)

Singles
"Awake"  (March 2004)
"Dostoievski" (July 2004)
"Are you playing a game?" (March 2005)
"Ink"  (March 2006)

External links
Avantgarde Official website
V2Music

Musical groups established in 2003
Spanish indie rock groups